Aldrete is a surname. Notable people with the surname include:

Adrián Aldrete (born 1988), Mexican footballer
Gregory S. Aldrete (born 1966), American academic and writer
Jorge Aldrete Lobo (1940-2020), Mexican chess master
Mike Aldrete (born 1961), American baseball player
Sara Aldrete (born 1964), Mexican serial killer